Ordtech Military Industries (OMI) is a defense manufacturer established in the 1980s in Greece, with production facilities in Tripoli and Kilkis (as Ordtech Hellas) and in other countries worldwide. 

Ordtech Military Industries produces, designs, upgrades and supports a wide range of weapons systems, munitions, aircraft armaments, missile systems, and other technologies. Its products and services include guided munitions, composite propellants, aerial bombs, unmanned military aircraft, launchers and unguided rockets, countermeasures, ordnance and weapons systems for aerial, land, and naval forces.

External links
 

Defence companies of Greece
Guided missiles of Greece
Aerial bombs
Greek brands
Companies based in Kilkis